Lesjaskog is a village in Lesja Municipality in Innlandet county, Norway. The European route E136 highway and the Raumabanen railway line both run through the village. Lesjaskog Church is located in the village.

The lake Lesjaskogsvatnet has outlets at both ends. A dam that was constructed by the Lesja Iron Works at the nearby village of Lesjaverk in the 1660s in order to improve transportation caused the water which normally drained only to the Rauma River to also flow eastwards into the Gudbrandsdalslågen river to the east.

During the Second World War during the Namsos Campaign the British No. 263 Squadron RAF operated with 18 Gloster Gladiator biplane fighters from the frozen surface of Lake Lesjaskogsvatnet at Lesjaskog.

References

External links
 Lesja municipality

Lesja
Villages in Innlandet